The six teams in this group played against each other on a home-and-away basis. The group winner Sweden qualified for the 17th FIFA World Cup held in South Korea and Japan. The runner-up Turkey advanced to the UEFA Play-off and played against Austria.  Sweden went undefeated through the group, conceding just two draws against Turkey and Slovakia: Turkey and Slovakia ran close for second, the positions eventually being decided by Turkey's victory in the second match between the two sides, which ensured that even their subsequent defeat to the Swedes could not keep them out of second place.

Standings

Results

Goalscorers

8 goals

 Henrik Larsson

5 goals

 Marcus Allbäck
 Hakan Şükür

4 goals

 Szilárd Németh

3 goals

 Igor Demo
 Anders Svensson
 Alpay Özalan

2 goals

 Vadim Vasilyev
 Gjorgji Hristov
 Artim Šakiri
 Serghei Cleşcenco
 Peter Németh

1 goal

 Fərrux İsmayılov
 Zaur Tağızadə
 Argjend Beqiri
 Mile Krstev
 Toni Micevski
 Dragan Načevski
 Igor Nikolovski
 Žarko Serafimovski
 Vančo Trajanov
 Ruslan Barburoş
 Serghei Covalciuc
 Serghei Pogreban
 Radu Rebeja
 Peter Dzúrik
 Ľubomír Meszároš
 Tomáš Oravec
 Attila Pinte
 Ľubomír Reiter
 Róbert Tomaschek
 Niclas Alexandersson
 Andreas Andersson
 Patrik Andersson
 Zlatan Ibrahimović
 Emre Aşık
 Emre Belözoğlu
 Okan Buruk
 Ümit Davala
 Oktay Derelioğlu
 Tayfur Havutçu
 Nihat Kahveci
 Tayfun Korkut
 İlhan Mansız

1 own goal

 Goran Stavrevski (playing against Slovakia)
 Igor Mitreski (playing against Turkey)

References

External links
FIFA official page
RSSSF - 2002 World Cup Qualification
Allworldcup

4
2000 in Swedish football
2001 in Swedish football
2000–01 in Turkish football
Turkey at the 2002 FIFA World Cup
2000–01 in Republic of Macedonia football
2001–02 in Republic of Macedonia football
2000–01 in Slovak football
2001–02 in Slovak football
2000–01 in Moldovan football
2001–02 in Moldovan football
2000–01 in Azerbaijani football
2001–02 in Azerbaijani football